Yeniseysky District is an administrative and municipal district (raion), one of the forty-three in Krasnoyarsk Krai, Russia. It is located in the west of the krai and borders with Turukhansky and Evenkiysky Districts in the north, Severo-Yeniseysky and Motyginsky Districts in the east, Kazachinsky District in the southeast, Pirovsky, Birilyussky, and Tyukhtetsky Districts in the southwest, Tomsk Oblast in the west, and with Khanty–Mansi Autonomous Okrug in the northwest. Its administrative center is the town of Yeniseysk (which is not administratively a part of the district). Population:  31,315 (2002 Census);

History
The district was founded on April 4, 1924.

Administrative and municipal status
Within the framework of administrative divisions, Yeniseysky District is one of the forty-three in the krai. The town of Yeniseysk serves as its administrative center, despite being incorporated separately as a krai town—an administrative unit with the status equal to that of the districts. The district is divided into one urban-type settlement (Podtyosovo) and twenty-five selsoviets.

As a municipal division, the district is incorporated as Yeniseysky Municipal District and is divided into one urban settlement (corresponding to the administrative district's urban-type settlement of Podtyosovo) and twenty-five rural settlements (corresponding to the administrative district's selsoviets). The krai town of Yeniseysk is incorporated separately from the district as Yeniseysk Urban Okrug.

References

Notes

Sources

Districts of Krasnoyarsk Krai
States and territories established in 1924